Yakty-Kul (Yaqtıkül) is a rural locality (a village) in Zilim-Karanovsky Selsoviet, Gafuriysky District, Bashkortostan, Russia. The population was 53 as of 2010. There is 1 street.

Geography 
Yakty-Kul is located 54 km north of Krasnousolsky (the district's administrative centre) by road. Andreyevka is the nearest rural locality.

References 

Rural localities in Gafuriysky District